This is a list of moths of the family Sesiidae that are found in India. It also acts as an index to the species articles and forms part of the full List of moths of India.

Genus Pramila
Pramila atkinsoni Moore, 1879

Genus Trochilium
 Trochilium ommatiaeforme Moore
 Trochilium ignicolle Hampson

Genus Sphecodoptera
 Sphecodoptera repanda Walker
 Sphecodoptera flavicollis Hampson

Genus Anthrenoptera
 Anthrenoptera contracta Walker

Genus Trilochana
 Trilochana scolioides Moore
 Trilochana ignicauda Hampson

Genus Sciapteron
 Sciapteron flammans Hampson
 Sciapteron grotei Moore
 Sciapteron cgeruleimicans Hampson
 Sciapteron atkinsoni Moore
 Sciapteron noblei Swinhoe
 Sciapteron sikkima Moore
 Sciapteron metallicum Hampson
 Sciapteron gracile Swinhoe
 Sciapteron cupreivitta Hampson
 Sciapteron tenuimarginatiim Hampson

Genus Macrotarsipus
 Macrotarsipus albipunctus Hampson

Genus Ichneumenoptera
 Ichneumenoptera auripes Hampson
 Ichneumenoptera flavicincta Hampson
 Ichneumenoptera xanthosoma Hampson
 Ichneumenoptera flavipalpus Hampson
 Ichneumenoptera ignifera Hampson

Genus Sesia
 Sesia quinquecincta Hampson
 Sesia minuta Swinhoe
 Sesia unicincta Hampson
 Sesia xanthosticta Hampson
 Sesia tricincta Moore
 Sesia flavicaudata Moore
 Sesia flavipes Hampson

Genus Adixoa
 Adixoa alterna Walker
 Adixoa auricollum Hampson

Genus Trichocerota
 Trichocerota ruficincta Hampson

Genus Tinthia
 Tinthia cupreipennis Walker

Genus Ceratocorema
 Ceratocorema postcristatum Hampson

Genus Aschistophleps
 Aschistophleps lampropoda Hampson
 mehssoides mehssoides Hampson

Genus Oligophlebia
 Oligophlebia nigralba Hampson

Genus Melittia
 Melittia astarte Westwood
 Melittia pellecta Swinhoe
 Melittia volatilis Swinhoe
 Melittia eurytion Westwood
 Melittia indica Butler
 Melittia grandis Hampson
 Melittia newara Moore
 Melittia kuluana Moore
 Melittia notabilis Swinhoe
 Melittia gigantea Moore
 Melittia chalciformis Fabricius
 Melittia nepcha Moore

Genus Lenyra
 Lenyra ashtaroth Westwood

See also
Sesiidae
Moths
Lepidoptera
List of moths of India

References
 Hampson, G.F. et al. (1892-1937) Fauna of British India Including Ceylon and Burma - Moths. Vols. 1-5 cxix + 2813 p - 1295 figs - 1 table - 15 pl (12 in col.)
 Savela, Markku. Website on Lepidoptera and Some Other Life Forms - page on family Sesiidae (Accessed 8 July 2007).

 
x
M